Gastronomica: The Journal of Food and Culture is a peer-reviewed interdisciplinary academic journal with a focus on food. It is published by the University of California Press. It was founded by Darra Goldstein in 2001.

Awards
The journal has received a number of accolades:
Prix d'Or at the Gourmet Voice World Media Festival in 2004
2007 Utne Independent Press Award for Social/Cultural Coverage
Best Food Magazine in the World at the 2011 Gourmand Awards in Paris
Co-winner of the 2012 James Beard Foundation Award for Best Publication of the Year.

References

External links

University of California Press academic journals
Food and drink magazines
Quarterly magazines published in the United States
Magazines established in 2001
Magazines published in California
History of food and drink